William Lloyd Benson (July 29, 1920 – February 8, 2012) was a Canadian professional ice hockey centreman who played two NHL seasons with the New York Americans, and Brooklyn Americans. He was born in Winnipeg, Manitoba.

Benson was the last surviving former player of the New York Americans.

Career statistics

Regular season and playoffs

Awards and achievements
 MJHL Scoring Champion (1940)
 Honoured Member of the Manitoba Hockey Hall of Fame

External links
 
 Bill Benson's obituary

1920 births
2012 deaths
Brooklyn Americans players
Canadian ice hockey centres
Cleveland Barons (1937–1973) players
New York Americans players
Pittsburgh Hornets players
Ice hockey people from Winnipeg
Springfield Indians players
Winnipeg Monarchs players